Preben Christiansen (7 December 1913 – 22 May 1979) was a Danish fencer. He competed in the individual and team épée and sabre events at the 1936 Summer Olympics.

References

1913 births
1979 deaths
Danish male fencers
Olympic fencers of Denmark
Fencers at the 1936 Summer Olympics